Tell el-Far'ah (South) (also Tell el-Fārʿa) is an archaeological site on the bank of HaBesor Stream in the northern Negev region, Israel. Not to be confused with the site Tell el-Far'ah (North).

Archaeology
The site runs about 185 meters N to S and about 115 meters E to W with a total area of around 2 hectares, with World War I trenching and modern graves present in some areas. The British Western Negev Expedition surveyed the area around Tell el-Far'ah (South) in 1972 to 1973 finding a Byzantine site 1 kilometer away and a paleolithic site across the wadi. It was first excavated by Flinders Petrie and E. McDonald for three seasons from  1928 to 1930. An advance team including Olga Tufnell and James Leslie Starkey had arrived in 1927 to begin work. Petrie focused primarily on graves and tombs. Rudolph Cohen directed salvage excavations at the site in 1977. The site was again excavated, after a survey season in 1998, in 1999 (with Claremont Graduate University) and 2002 (with Rostock University) by a team from Ben-Gurion University led by Gunnar Lehmann. Finds included a small ostracon fragment which read "To Our Lord" in an early Canaanite alphabetic script.

Identification
Flinders Petrie identified the site with Beit Pelet in the territory of the Tribe of Judah. William F. Albright identified the site with Sharuhen, which appears in Egyptian and Biblical sources. N. Na'aman proposed identifying the site
with Biblical Shur. E. A. Knauf and H. M. Niemann locate Ziklag at the site. The actual identification is still in dispute.

History of occupation

Bronze Age
The site was lightly occupied beginning in the Middle Bronze Age II, circa 1600 BC. The town did have fortifications, a city gate, and a moat and is generally identified as a Hyksos settlement.
Starting around 1500 BC many of the numerous city-states of southern Canaan came under direct Egyptian control or became vassal states. Control became more direct in the Late Bronze Age during the times of pharaohs Seti I (1294–1279 BC), Ramesses II (1279–1213 BC), Merneptah (1213–1203 BC), and  Ramesses III (1184–1153 BC). It is believed that the site of Tell el-Far’ah (South) became an Egyptian administrative center and garrison during this time. A large, 600 square meter, monumental building was constructed (called the "Governor’s Residency" by Petrie). It was built of mud bricks on a baked brick foundation using Egyptian methods. Egyptian finds included pottery, scarabs, amulets, and two bowls with Egyptian hieratic inscriptions (related to tax collection). There is scholarly debate of whether Egyptians were living at the site or "Egyptian inspired" locals.

Iron Age
The Petrie excavation found a large number of tombs and graves with pottery having a close connection with Mycenae Greek which Petrie termed "Philistine", a designation which has been maintained. These remains lie above a destruction layer which contained a jar shard with the mark of Egyptian pharaoh Seti II (c. 1203 BC to 1197 BC) which sets a "no earlier than" date for the "Philistine" finds.

Classical period
After a possible break in Neo-Babylonian times the site was lightly occupied in Hellenistic and Persian times, with somewhat greater activity in Roman times.

See also
Cities of the ancient Near East
Nahal Besor

References

Further reading
Braunstein, S. L., The Dynamics of Power in an Age of Transition: An Analysis of the Mortuary Remains of Tell el-Farʿah (South) in the Late Bronze and Early Iron Age.", Ph.D. dissertation, Columbia University, 1998
Fischer, E., "Tell el-Farʿah (Süd): Ägyptisch-levantinische Beziehungen im späten 2. Jahrtausend v. Chr.", Orbis Biblicus et Orientalis 247. Fribourg: Academic, 2011
Khalil, L.A., "Metallurgy of Some Bronze Utensils from Fara.", Bulletin of the University of London Institute of Archaeology 23: 171–178, 1986
E. A. Knauf and H. M. Niemann, "Zum Ostrakon 1027 vom Tell Fara Süd (Tell el-Fāri/Tel Šaruhen)", Ugarit-For-schungen 31, 247–250, 1999
E. A. Knauf and H. M. Niemann, "Weitere Überlegungen zum neuen Ostracon 1027 vom Teil el-Farať Süd", Biblische Notizen 109, 19–20, 2001
Laemmel, Sabine. "A case study of the Late Bronze and Early Iron Age cemeteries of Tell el-Far'ah (South).", Diss. University of Oxford, 2003.
Maxwell-Hyslop, K.R.; Stech Wheeler, T.; Maddin, R.; and Muhly, J.D., "An Iron Dagger from Tomb 240 at Tell Fara South.", Levant 10: 112–115, 1978
Maxwell-Hyslop, K.R.; Moorey, P.R.S.; and Parr, P.J., "A Silver Earring from Tell el- Farah (South).", pp. 180–182 in Archaeology in the Levant: Essays for Kathleen M. Kenyon. Warminster: Aris & Phillips, Ltd., 1978
 Reeves, Rebecca., "A Landscape of Death: A Comparison of Non-adult to Adult Burials at the Late Bronze Age Site of Tell el-Far'ah (South)." (2018)
Shea, M.O.D., "A Small Cuboid Incense-Burner from Tell Fara in Southern Palestine.", Bulletin of the Institute of Archaeology. London 23: 161–169, 1986
Singer, Itamar. "Two hittite ring seals from Tell el-Far'ah (South)." Eres Israel 27 (2003)
Stiebing, W. H., Jr, "Another Look at the Origins of the Philistine Tombs at Tell el-Farʿah (S)",  American Journal of Archaeology 74: 139–43, 1970
Waldbaum, J. C. "Philistine Tombs at Tell Fara and Their Aegean Prototypes.", American Journal of Archaeology 70: 331–40, 1966

External links
Current Excavation Project Website at Claremont Graduate University

1928 archaeological discoveries
Archaeological sites in Israel
Negev
Tells (archaeology)